Urbain Servranckx (born 7 June 1949), better known as Urbanus, is a Belgian comedian, actor, singer and comic book writer. Although he is most famous as comedian, some of his songs became hits, such as Bakske vol met stro (1979), Madammen met een bontjas (1980) and Hittentit (1982). In Flanders and the Netherlands Urbanus is one of the most popular and famous entertainers of all time.

Career
Urbanus, artist's name of Urbain Joseph Servranckx (Dilbeek, 7 June 1949) is a Belgian comedian, singer, guitarist, author of comic books and actor. Originally he used the artist name: Urbanus van Anus. Anus was the name of his former backing group. In 1973 he began performing cabaret and comedy. He became popular in Flanders and managed to duplicate his success in the Netherlands, building a steady career since. He has appeared in TV shows, some which he wrote himself. Urbanus released several musical singles, some of which entered the hit parade. Urbain went solo in 1974 under the name Urbanus van Anus. After the then BRT (Belgian Radio and Television) asked him for a comic act, he dropped the name "van Anus" and since then it has been simply Urbanus. The first cover of Urbanus live was also drawn by Daniël Geirnaert. His Christmas song Bakske Vol Met Stro (1979) was controversial for lampooning the biblical story of the birth of Jesus, but also became his signature song and best-selling record for the very same reasons. Urbanus considers himself an atheist, although he wed in the Roman Catholic Church and had his children baptized. In 2008, he was awarded the Prize for Liberty by the Flemish think tank Nova Civitas.

Film career
Urbanus starred in three films: Hector (1987), Koko Flanel (1990) and Seventh Heaven (1993). The two first films were the leaders in the Flemish box offices for many years. His first movie, Hector, directed by Stijn Coninx, won the 1988 international comedy film festival in Chamrousse, France. He also was named best actor by Radio France and Dauphiné Libéré. Seventh Heaven was a box office bomb. In Flanders and the Netherlands Urbanus is well-known and very popular since 1974. Although he is most famous as a comedian, some of his songs became hits, such as Bakske vol met stro (1979), Madammen met een bontjas (1980) and Hittentit (1982). Urbanus lent his voice to the Flemish versions of the Pixar movies, Cars and Cars 2, where he was the voice of the character Mater.

Comics career
Urbanus is script writer of a comics series about a childlike version of himself, Urbanus, which debuted in 1982. The series is drawn by Willy Linthout and from the third story on, Urbanus started providing the scenarios. The comic strip managed to become the longest-running series in the celebrity-inspired genre and new albums are still published to this day. The comics also sell well in the Netherlands.

Urbanus also writes the gags for the satirical comic De Geverniste Vernepelingskes (1998), which pokes fun at several Flemish celebrities. It was first drawn by Jan Bosschaert, then Dirk Stallaert and finally Steven Dupré. Urbanus also writes gags for the children's comics Plankgas en Plastronneke (2004–2008) and Mieleke Melleke Mol (since 2003), both drawn by Dirk Stallaert.

Urbanus has also drawn some gag comics himself. He also illustrated many of his own album covers.

Discography

Albums

Singles

Films
Urbanus produced and appeared in several movies:
Hector (1988)
Koko Flanel (1990)
Les Sept péchés capitaux (1992)
De Zevende Hemel (1993)
Max (1994)
 (2004)
K3 en het IJsprinsesje (2007)

Urbanus did voices for the following movies:
March of the Penguins (2005) – narration for the Dutch version
Cars (2006) – voice of Mater for the Flemish version

References

External links

 
 urbanusstrips.blogspot.com Urbanus comic books
 Lambiek Comiclopedia article about his entire life and career

1949 births
Living people
20th-century Flemish male actors
21st-century Flemish male actors
20th-century Belgian male singers
20th-century Belgian singers
21st-century Belgian male singers
21st-century Belgian singers
Belgian atheists
Belgian stand-up comedians
Belgian comedy musicians
Belgian humorists
Belgian pop singers
Belgian rock singers
Belgian singer-songwriters
Belgian male guitarists
Belgian satirists
Belgian surrealist artists
Belgian comics writers
Belgian comics artists
Album-cover and concert-poster artists
Flemish male film actors
Flemish male voice actors
Flemish television writers
People from Dilbeek
Dutch-language singers of Belgium
Surreal comedy
Male television writers
Religious controversies in music
Religious controversies in television
Religious controversies in Belgium
Obscenity controversies in music
Television controversies in Belgium